Catchgate is a former mining village in County Durham, England. It has a population of approximately 3,000 people.

Its nearest town is Stanley, also a former coal mining community.

It is bordered by the villages of Greencroft to the west, Annfield Plain to the south, Harelaw to the north, and West Kyo (also known as Old Kyo) to the east. Also once to the west of Catchgate was Pontop village, now no more than a few bungalows, dominated by the enormous Pontop Pike television and radio transmitter.

References

Villages in County Durham
Stanley, County Durham